SLA may refer to:

Geography
 Martín Miguel de Güemes International Airport, Salta, Argentina, IATA code

Science and engineering
 Sealed lead-acid battery
 Second-language acquisition
 Short long arms suspension, in vehicles
Soluble liver antigen or O-phosphoseryl-tRNA(Sec) selenium transferase, an enzyme
 Spacecraft Lunar Module Adapter, part of Apollo/Saturn S-IVB
 Specific leaf area, ratio of leaf area to dry mass on a plant
 Stereo lithographic apparatus, a 3D printing technology

Organizations
 Science Leadership Academy, Philadelphia, Pennsylvania, US
 School Library Association
 Sindhi Language Authority, Pakistan
 Sindhudesh Liberation Army, a separatist organisation in Pakistan
Singapore Land Authority
 South Lebanon Army, Lebanese Civil War militia
 Special Libraries Association, for librarians
 Sri Lanka Army
 State Liquor Authority, New York, US
 Sudan Liberation Movement/Army, a rebel group in Darfur
 Symbionese Liberation Army, 1970s US radical group

Other
 Service-level agreement
 SLA Industries, a role-playing game
 File format used by Scribus software
 Softwood Lumber Agreement between US and Canada